This is a list of electoral divisions and wards in the ceremonial county of Cambridgeshire in the East of England. All changes since the re-organisation of local government following the passing of the Local Government Act 1972 are shown. The number of councillors elected for each electoral division or ward is shown in brackets.

County council

Cambridgeshire
Electoral Divisions from 1 April 1974 (first election 12 April 1973) to 2 May 1985:

Electoral Divisions from 2 May 1985 to 5 May 2005:

Electoral Divisions from 5 May 2005 to 4 May 2017:

† minor boundary changes in 2009 ‡ minor boundary changes in 2013

Electoral Divisions from 4 May 2017 to present:

Unitary authority council

Peterborough
Wards from 1 April 1974 (first election 7 June 1973) to 6 May 1976:

Wards from 6 May 1976 to 1 May 1997:

Wards due from 1 May 1997 (order revoked shortly before election):

Wards from 1 May 1997 to 10 June 2004:

Wards from 10 June 2004 to 5 May 2016: 

† minor boundary changes in 2007

Wards from 5 May 2016 to present:

District councils

Cambridge
Wards from 1 April 1974 (first election 7 June 1973) to 6 May 1976:

Wards from 6 May 1976 to 10 June 2004:

Wards from 10 June 2004 to present (boundary changes in 2021):

East Cambridgeshire
Wards from 1 April 1974 (first election 7 June 1973) to 5 May 1983:

Wards from 5 May 1983 to 1 May 2003:

Wards from 1 May 2003 to 2 May 2019:

Wards from 2 May 2019 to present:

Fenland
Wards from 1 April 1974 (first election 7 June 1973) to 6 May 1976:

Wards from 6 May 1976 to 1 May 2003:

Wards from 1 May 2003 to 7 May 2015:

Wards from 7 May 2015 to present:

Huntingdonshire
Wards from 1 April 1974 (first election 7 June 1973) to 6 May 1976:

Wards from 6 May 1976 to 10 June 2004:

Wards from 10 June 2004 to 3 May 2018:

Wards from 3 May 2018 to present:

South Cambridgeshire
Wards from 1 April 1974 (first election 7 June 1973) to 6 May 1976:

Wards from 6 May 1976 to 10 June 2004:

Wards from 10 June 2004 to 3 May 2018:

† minor boundary changes in 2008

Wards from 3 May 2018 to present:

Electoral wards by constituency
As at 8 May 2022.

Cambridge

Abbey, Arbury, Castle, Cherry Hinton, Coleridge, East Chesterton, King's Hedges, Market, Newnham, Petersfield, Romsey, Trumpington, West Chesterton.

Huntingdon
Alconbury (part), Brampton, Buckden, Fenstanton, Godmanchester and Hemingford Abbots, Great Paxton, Great Stauton (part), Hemingford Grey and Houghton (part), Huntingdon East, Huntingdon North, Kimbolton (part), St Ives East, St Ives South (part), St Ives West, St Neots East, St Neots Eatons, St Neots Eynesbury, St Neots Priory Park and Little Paxton, The Stukeleys.

North East Cambridgeshire
Bassenhally, Benwick, Coates and Eastrea, Birch, Clarkson, Doddington and Wimblington, Downham Villages, Elm and Christchurch, Kirkgate, Lattersey, Littleport, Manea, March East, March North, March West, Medworth, Octavia Hill, Parson Drove and Wisbech St Mary, Peckover, Roman Bank, Slade Lode, St Andrews, Staithe, Stonald, Sutton, The Mills, Waterlees Village, Wenneye.

North West Cambridgeshire
Alconbury (part), Barnack, Fletton and Stanground, Fletton and Woodston (part), Glinton and Castor (part), Great Stauton (part), Hampton Vale, Hargate and Hempsted, Hemingford Grey and Houghton (part), Holywell-cum-Needingworth, Kimbolton (part), Orton Longueville, Orton Waterville, Ramsey, Sawtry, Somersham, St Ives South (part), Stanground South, Stilton, Folksworth and Washingley, Warboys, Wittering, Yaxley.

Peterborough
Bretton, Central, Dogsthorpe, East, Eye, Thorney and Newborough, Fletton and Woodston (part), Glinton and Castor (part), Gunthorpe, North, Park, Paston and Walton, Ravensthorpe, Werrington, West.

South Cambridgeshire
Bar Hill, Barrington, Bassingbourn, Caldecote, Cambourne, Caxton and Papworth, Cottenham, Duxford, Foxton, Gamlingay, Girton, Hardwick, Harston and Comberton, Linton (part), Longstanton, Melbourn, Queen Edith's, Sawston, Shelford, Swavesey, The Mordens, Whittlesford.

South East Cambridgeshire
Balsham, Bottisham, Burwell, Ely East, Ely North, Ely West, Fen Ditton and Fulbourn, Fordham and Isleham, Haddenham, Histon and Impington, Linton (part), Milton and Waterbeach, Over and Willingham, Soham North, Soham South, Stretham, Woodditton.

See also
List of parliamentary constituencies in Cambridgeshire

References

 
Cambridgeshire
Wards